The ostrich instruction is a jury instruction that the requirement of knowledge to establish a guilty mind (mens rea), is satisfied by deliberate ignorance - deliberate avoidance of knowledge. It arose from the case of United States v. Jewell.

References

Legal procedure
Juries
United States criminal law